Hear the Beatles Tell All (subtitled Live in Person Interviews Recorded During Their Latest American Tour) is an album released in the United States by Vee-Jay Records in November 1964. One side of the album contains an interview with all four members of the Beatles by Dave Hull, and the other side contains an interview with John Lennon by Jim Steck. It became the only album on which Capitol Records could not dispute Vee Jay Records' publishing rights.

It was originally published as a promotional edition during the Beatles' tour of the United States between August and September 1964. Later, it was officially released in November of that year.

Origin 
Jim Steck and Dave Hull, of the Los Angeles radio station KRLA 1110, interviewed the Beatles during their 1964 American tour. After KRLA broadcast the interviews, Vee-Jay reached an agreement with those responsible to edit them into an album. To make the record cohesive, Vee-jay enlisted the services of Lou Adler, the co-founder of Dunhill Records and chief recording producer there between 1964 and 1967. Adler decided to apply screaming and various noises from live audiences to the recordings, as well as various percussion by Hal Blaine, a successful session drummer in American recording studios.

Contents

Side 1 
Steck interviewed John Lennon in Los Angeles on August 24, 1964. Lennon talked about:

 the audience at the Hollywood Bowl (the Beatles had performed there the day before)
 commercial radio
 the origin of the name "The Beatles"
 long hair
 skiffle music / band line-up
 future plans
 educational teaching received and its academic failures
 their home in Liverpool

Side 2 
The members of the Beatles were interviewed by Hull, known to the group thereafter as "the man who made our home addresses public". Interviews were conducted on August 25, 1964. They discussed:

 Paul McCartney: Jane Asher and her family
 Lennon: his wife having a baby
 George Harrison: his mother answering fan letters / Pattie Boyd
 McCartney: making known the address of the domiciles of the group members
 Lennon: A Hard Day's Night / New house in Surrey
 Ringo Starr: his throat operation
 McCartney: his father's racehorse, called "Drake's Drum"
 Starr: Maureen / Disneyland
 Harrison: Disneyland

When each of the group members was asked which part of the movie A Hard Day's Night was their favorite, they all replied, "The scene where they jump and run in the open field to the sound of 'Can't Buy Me Love'".

References 

1964 albums
Radio programmes about the Beatles
The Beatles albums
Vee-Jay Records albums
Interview albums
Charly Records albums